Satya Sadhan Chakraborty (1933 – 16 June 2018) was an  Indian academic, textbook writer and politician from West Bengal belonging to  Communist Party of India (Marxist). He was a member of the Lok Sabha and West Bengal Legislative Assembly. He also served as a minister of the Government of West Bengal.

Early life and education
Chakraborty was born on 1933 at Harina in Comilla. He graduated from Bangabasi College. Later, he completed postgraduate studies from University of Calcutta in political science.

Career
Chakraborty was a professor of the Vidyasagar College. He also coauthored a book titled Bharoter Shasonbyabostha O Rajneeti with Nimai Pramanik. The book is used as a textbook in graduate level. Besides, he served as the general secretary of the West Bengal College and University Teachers' Association and All India Federation of University & College Teachers' Organisations.

Chakraborty was elected as a member of the Lok Sabha from Calcutta South in 1980. Later, he was elected as a member of the West Bengal Legislative Assembly from Chakdaha in 1991, 1996 and 2001. He also served as the Higher Education Minister of the Government of West Bengal from 1991 to 2006.

Personal life
Chakroborty was married to Sukla Chakraborty in 1961. They had one daughter.

Death
Chakraborty died on 16 June 2018 at Salt Lake in Kolkata at the age of 85.

References

1933 births
2018 deaths
People from Comilla District
Academic staff of Vidyasagar College
University of Calcutta alumni
Lok Sabha members from West Bengal
India MPs 1980–1984
Indian textbook writers
State cabinet ministers of West Bengal
West Bengal MLAs 1991–1996
West Bengal MLAs 1996–2001
West Bengal MLAs 2001–2006
Communist Party of India (Marxist) politicians from West Bengal